Macae, Rio de Janeiro, Brazil was the first leg of the 2013-14 South American Beach Volleyball Circuit, the tournament was held March 24–26, 2014.

32 teams participated in the event (16 per gender). Brazil took gold on home soil in both male and female categories, 2013 U21 World Champions Allison Francioni and Gustavo Carvalhaes won for the men while Carolina Horta and Claudinere Sabino took gold in the women's competition.

Women's Competition

Participating teams

 ARG1 Ana Gallay–Georgina Klug
 ARG2 Virginia Zonta–Julieta Puntin
 BOL1 Marxia Reyes–Diva Oropeza
 BOL2 María Rene Jofre–María Rene Vila
 BRA1 Elize Maia–Fernanda Berti
 BRA2 Eduarda Lisboa–Thais Ferreira
 BRA3 Carolina Horta–Claudinere Sabino
 BRA4 Pauline Da Silva–Vanilda Leao
 BRA5 Rachel Nunhes–Camila Fonseca
 BRA6 Andressa Ramalho–Paula Hoffmann
 CHI1 Camila Pazdirek–Francesca Rivas
 CHI2 Daniela Bravo–Natalia Depassier
 PAR1 Michelle Valiente–Gabriela Filippo
 PAR2 Johana Ocampos–Erika Mongelos
 URU1 Lucía Guigou–Fabiana Gómez
 URU2 Lia Fortunati–Eugenia Nieto

Pools

Pool A

|}

|}

Pool B

|}

|}

Pool C

|}

|}

Pool D

|}

|}

Championship bracket

Quarterfinals

|}

Semifinals

|}

Third-place match

|}

Final

|}

Ranking

Men's Competition

Participating teams

 ARG1 Julian Azaad–Ian Mehamed
 ARG2 Facundo Del Coto–Pablo Bianchi
 BOL1 Fernando Barrientos–Juan Pablo Naim
 BOL2 Israel Martínez–Sergio Franco
 BRA1 Alvaro Filho–Edson de Barros
 BRA2 Oscar Brandao–Thiago Barbosa
 BRA3 Bruno Lima–Heriberto Lima
 BRA4 Allison Francioni–Gustavo Carvalhaes
 BRA5 Saymon Barbosa–Marcio Gaudie Ley
 BRA6 Joallison Gomez–Hevaldo Sabino
 CHI1 Esteban Grimalt–Marco Grimalt
 CHI2 Cristobal Martínez–Rodrigo Salinas
 PAR1 Luis Riveros–Mauricio Brizuela
 PAR2 Roger Battilana–Gregorio Godoy
 URU1 Renzo Cairus–Nicolás Zanotta
 URU2 Guillermo Williman–Pablo Rodríguez

Pools

Pool A

|}

|}

Pool B

|}

|}

Pool C

|}

|}

Pool D

|}

|}

Championship bracket

Quarterfinals

|}

Semifinals

|}

Third-place match

|}

Final

|}

Ranking

Ranking after first stop

Women

Men

References

2014 in beach volleyball
South American Beach Volleyball Circuit 2013-14